
Gmina Lubomia is a rural gmina (administrative district) in Wodzisław County, Silesian Voivodeship, in southern Poland.

Villages
Gmina Lubomia contains the villages and settlements of Buglowiec, Buków, Grabówka, Ligota Tworkowska, Lubomia, Nieboczowy, Nowy Dwór, Syrynia and Trawniki.

Neighbouring gminas
Gmina Lubomia is bordered by the towns of Pszów, Racibórz and Wodzisław Śląski, and by the gminas of Gorzyce, Kornowac and Krzyżanowice.

Twin towns – sister cities

Gmina Lubomia is twinned with:
 Horní Suchá, Czech Republic

References

Lubomia
Wodzisław County